Toni McNaron, also known as Toni A. H. McNaron, (born April 3, 1937) is an American literary scholar. She is a professor emerita of English at the University of Minnesota, and the author of several books, including Poisoned Ivy, about lesbophobic and homophobic workplace bullying in academia.

Early life
McNaron was born on April 3, 1937, in Alabama. She graduated from the University of Alabama, and she earned a master's degree from Vanderbilt University followed by a PhD from the University of Wisconsin.

Career
McNaron spent her entire career in the Department of English at the University of Minnesota. She was assistant professor from 1964 to 1967, associate professor from 1967 to 1983, and a full professor from 1983 to 2001, when she became a professor emeritus.

McNaron is the author and/or co-editor of several academic books about incest, feminism and LGBT topics as well as her own memoirs. In Poisoned Ivy, she writes about closeted academics and what she describes as the homophobic workplace bullying that those who come out are subjected to.

Personal life
McNaron stopped drinking and came out as a lesbian in 1973. She also became a feminist and an anti-Vietnam War activist.

Selected works

References

External links
Official website

1937 births
Living people
Writers from Alabama
University of Alabama alumni
Vanderbilt University alumni
University of Wisconsin–Madison alumni
University of Minnesota faculty
Lesbian academics
American memoirists
LGBT memoirists
American feminists
American anti–Vietnam War activists
American women memoirists
LGBT people from Alabama
American women academics